Styphelia crassifolia is a plant in the family Ericaceae native to Western Australia. It was first described in 1845 as Leucopogon crassifolius by Otto Wilhelm Sonder. In 1867 Ferdinand von Mueller transferred it to the genus, Styphelia, but the accepted name continued to be Leucopogon crassifolius. However, in 2020, with a publication concerning the phylogeny of Styphelia by Crayn and others, the name Styphelia crassifolia was accepted by the Herbarium of Western Australia. (The Council of Heads of Australasian Herbaria still (May 2020) lists Leucopogon crassifolius as the accepted name.)

References

crassifolia
Ericales of Australia
Flora of Western Australia
Plants described in 1845
Taxa named by Ferdinand von Mueller